(born 24 March 1997) is a Japanese weightlifter. She won the bronze medal in the women's 49kg event at the 2021 World Weightlifting Championships held in Tashkent, Uzbekistan.

Career 

She won the clean & jerk bronze medal in the women's 48kg event at the 2017 Junior World Weightlifting Championships held in Tokyo, Japan. She also competed in the women's 48kg event at the 2017 World Weightlifting Championships held in Anaheim, United States.

In 2018, she competed in the women's 48kg event at the Asian Games held in Jakarta, Indonesia. She finished in 7th place. A few months later, she competed in the women's 49kg event at the 2018 World Weightlifting Championships held in Ashgabat, Turkmenistan.

She also competed in the women's 49kg event at the 2019 World Weightlifting Championships held in Pattaya, Thailand.

Achievements

References

External links 
 

Living people
1997 births
Place of birth missing (living people)
Japanese female weightlifters
World Weightlifting Championships medalists
Competitors at the 2017 Summer Universiade
Weightlifters at the 2018 Asian Games
Asian Games competitors for Japan
21st-century Japanese women